Calochortus gunnisonii (Gunnison's mariposa lily) is a North American species of flowering plant in the lily family. It is native to the western United States, primarily in the Rocky Mountains and Black Hills: Arizona, New Mexico, Utah, Colorado, Wyoming, Montana, South Dakota, Washington state (Grant County, northwestern Nebraska (Sioux County) and eastern Idaho (Fremont County).

Calochortus gunnisonii is a bulb-forming perennial with straight stems up to 55 cm tall. Flowers are white to purple with darker purple markings.

Varieties
 Calochortus gunnisonii var. gunnisonii - most of species range
 Calochortus gunnisonii var. perpulcher Cockerell - New Mexico

The subspecies Calochortus gunnisonii var. perpulcher (Pecos mariposa lily) is an uncommon yellow color form limited to Colfax, Mora, and San Miguel counties in New Mexico.

Gallery

References 

gunnisonii
Flora of Nebraska
Flora of South Dakota
Flora of the Northwestern United States
Flora of Colorado
Flora of Montana
Flora of Wyoming
Flora of Arizona
Flora of Utah
Flora of New Mexico
Plants described in 1871
Taxa named by Sereno Watson
Flora without expected TNC conservation status